Mark F. Horstemeyer (born November 11, 1962) is the Dean of the School of Engineering at Liberty University. He was the Giles Distinguished Professor at Mississippi State University (MSU) and professor in the Mechanical Engineering Department at Mississippi State University (2002–2018), holding a Chair position for the Center for Advanced Vehicular Systems (CAVS) in Computational Solid Mechanics; he was also the Chief Technical Officer for CAVS.  Before coming to MSU, he worked for Sandia National Laboratories for fifteen years (1987-2002) in the area of multiscale modeling for design.

Books
Horstemeyer is the author of Integrated Computational Materials Engineering (ICME) for Metals: Using Multiscale Modeling to Invigorate Engineering Design with Science, published in July 2012.  He also is the author of Integrated Computational Materials Engineering (ICME) for Metals: Concepts and Case Studies, published in July 2018.

Honors and awards
A list of the awards and honors are as follows:

 European Union Academy of Sciences (2017)
American Association for the Advancement of Science (AAAS) Fellow (2013)
Society of Automotive Engineering (SAE) Fellow (2012) 
West Virginia University Distinguished Alumni Award (2012)
Giles Professor (Highest Honor at the university), Mississippi State University (2011)
Plasticity Research Award for Young Investigator, International Conference on Plasticity, Puerto Vallarta, Mexico (2011)
Honorary Professor at Xihua University, Sichuan Province, Chengdu, China (2010)
American Society of Metals (ASM) Fellow (2010)
Thomas French Alumni Achievement Award, Ohio State University (2009)
Ralph Powe Award Mississippi State University (highest university research award) (2008)
ASME Materials Division Chair (2007)
Society of Automotive Engineering (SAE) Teeter Award (2007)
National Leadership Entrepreneurial Award (2007)
American Society of Mechanical Engineering (ASME) Fellow (2006)
Institute of Physics Select Paper (most downloaded paper): A multiscale analysis of fixed-end simple shear using molecular dynamics, crystal plasticity, and a macroscopic internal state variable theory (2004)
Baseball Hall of Fame Physics of Baseball Panel (2004)
Appointed to ASME Materials Executive Board (2004)
Columbia Accident Investigation Board Consultant (2003)
American Foundry Society "Best Paper Award" (2003)
DOE Recognition Award (2000) USCAR work
R&D100 Award (2000) microstructure-property modeling
American Foundrymen's Society Award (2000) casting modeling
Society of Automotive Engineers (SAE) (1996) technical recognition award
Sandia Doctoral Study Program (1993-1995) internal state variable plasticity
Sandia Award For Excellence (1992) finite element lethality studies
Sandia Award For Excellence (1990) weapons experiments
Sandia Award For Excellence (1989) weapons design

He is a fellow of the American Society of Mechanical Engineers, the American Society of Metals, the American Association for the Advancement of Science, and the Society of Automotive Engineers.

References

External links
CAVS Directory Information
Mississippi State University Research
Predictive Design Technology, LLC
Research Gate Papers
Google Scholar (Papers/Citations)

Living people
American mechanical engineers
Sandia National Laboratories people
Mississippi State University faculty
Fellows of the American Society of Mechanical Engineers
Fellows of the American Association for the Advancement of Science
1962 births